Aïssa Touré (born 9 August 1984) is a Malian retired footballer who played as a defender. She has been a member of the Mali women's national team.

Club career
Touré has played for FC Amazones in Mali.

International career
Touré capped for Mali at senior level during two Africa Women Cup of Nations editions (2002 and 2006).

References

1984 births
Living people
Malian women's footballers
Women's association football defenders
Mali women's international footballers
21st-century Malian people